Thitisan Panmod (born 5 December 2000) is a Thai amateur boxer. As an amateur, he won 2018 AIBA Youth World Boxing Championships.

Early life & Muay Thai career
Panmod (nicknamed Lerm; เหลิม) born in boxer family in Phichit, upper central Thailand. His father owned a small Muay Thai gym called "Sor. Sayan". He practiced Muay Thai for the first time when he was a student because he was angry at being bullied by his friends, with his father as a trainer. But his father took him to a local tournament, where he became the northern champion.

Then, two years later, he set his sights on boxing by attending the Phitsanulok Provincial Sports School and has started practicing amateur boxing ever since.

Amateur career
He represented Thailand in AIBA Youth World Boxing Championships and defeated Puerto Rican boxer Jan Paul Rivera to win gold medal.

2020 Summer Olympics
For 2020 Summer Olympics, Panmod has represented the Thailand national team in the 52 kg class (Flyweight) at the age of 19 and is one of just two of the Thai men's boxers (another one is senior Chatchai-decha Butdee). Unfortunately, shortly before the start of the competition. He also suffered a knee injury during a training session at a training camp in Saraburi Province, therefore requested to withdraw in the end.

References

Living people
2000 births
Thitisan Panmod
Thitisan Panmod
Thitisan Panmod
Youth and Junior World Boxing Championships medalists